Calgary Southeast was a federal electoral district in Alberta, Canada, that was represented in the House of Commons of Canada from 1988 to 2015. The district was in the southeast part of the City of Calgary. It was bounded by the city limits to the south and east.

History
The electoral district was created in 1986 from Calgary East, Bow River and Calgary South ridings.

In 1996, parts were transferred from this electoral district to Calgary East.

Members of Parliament

This riding has elected the following Members of Parliament:

Election results

Note: Conservative vote is compared to the total of Progressive Conservative and Canadian Alliance vote in 2000.

Note: Canadian Alliance vote is compared to the Reform vote in 1997.

See also
 List of Canadian federal electoral districts
 Past Canadian electoral districts

References
 
 
 Expenditures -2008
 Expenditures - 2004
 Expenditures - 2000
 Expenditures - 1997

Notes

External links
 Elections Canada
 Website of the Parliament of Canada

Former federal electoral districts of Alberta
Politics of Calgary
Constituencies disestablished in 2013